The Federal Shariat Court (FSC) is a constitutional court of the Islamic Republic of Pakistan, which has the power to examine and determine whether the laws of the country comply with Sharia law. The court was established in 1980 during the government of the President General Muhammad Zia-ul-Haq. It is located in the federal capital, Islamabad. It hears appeals under the Hudood Ordinances, a religious legislation in the country introduced in 1979.

The Federal Shariat Court is the only constitutional authority in the country designed to prevent enactment of un-Islamic laws by the parliament of Pakistan. It is predominantly focused on to examine new or existing law of Pakistan. If a law violates the Quran, sunnah or hadith, it prohibits its enactment.

Justice Dr. Syed Muhammad Anwer, is the current  Acting Chief Justice of the Federal Shariat Court, having taken oath on  May 16, 2022.

Court structure and mandate

It consists of eight Muslim judges appointed by the President of Pakistan on the advice of the Chief Justice of the Court, from amongst the serving or retired judges of the Supreme Court or a High Court or from amongst persons possessing the qualifications of High Court judges. Of the 8 judges, 3 are required to be Ulema who are well versed in Islamic law. The judges hold office for a period of 3 years, which may eventually be extended by the President.

Appeal against its decisions lie to the Shariat Appellate Bench of the Supreme Court, consisting of 3 Muslim judges of the Supreme Court and 2 Ulema, appointed by the President. If any part of the law is declared to be against Islamic law, the government is required to take necessary steps to amend such law appropriately.

The court also exercises revisional jurisdiction over the criminal courts, deciding Hudood cases. The decisions of the court are binding on the High Courts as well as subordinate judiciary. The court appoints its own staff and frames its own rules of procedure.

Court's history of cases
In March 1981, the court ruled in an adultery appeal that stoning people to death was "repugnant to the injunctions of Islam," a decision that upset ruling General Zia ul-Haq, and Islamic revivalists. Zia ul-Haq then replaced several members of the court, and the above-mentioned decision was reversed.

In 1982, the Federal Shariat Court ruled that there is no prohibition in the Qur'an or Hadith about the judgeship of a woman nor any restriction limiting the function of deciding disputes to men only. In 2013 Ashraf Jehan became the first female justice of the Federal Shariat Court.

In 2016, Provincial Assembly of the Punjab passed a legislature, the Punjab Protection of Women against Violence Act 2016. Soon after its passing, it was challenged in Federal Shariat Court.

In February 2017, the court issued its ruling on test-tube babies and validated its use conditionally. The Nation reported, "The Federal Shariat Court yesterday declared the option of using 'test tube baby' method for conceiving babies for the married couples having some medical complications as lawful."

The fact that lawyers make up a permanent majority of judges of the court, outnumbering Islamic ulama, has been credited with the court finding "technical flaws in every stoning and amputation appeal that it has ever heard", preventing the carrying out of sentences amputating limbs and killing by stoning.

Chief Justice and judges

See also
List of Chief Justices of the Federal Shariat Court

References

External links

 Pakistan Federal Shariat Court on worldcat.org website

Further reading
  Salman Akram Raja,  An act of appeasement?, The News International  January 16, 2016

1980 establishments in Pakistan
Constitutional courts
Courts and tribunals established in 1980
Court system of Pakistan
Sharia in Pakistan
Islamization